Ptocheia or Ptokheia (pronounced pa-toh-KEE-uh; Ancient Greek: Πτωχείας) was the ancient Greek female spirit of beggary. She was regarded as a companion (and a sister) of Penia and Amechania. Her opposites were Euthenia and Ploutos.

Note

Greek goddesses
Personifications in Greek mythology